Dealer's choice may refer to:
 Dealer's choice, a style of poker
 Dealer's Choice (play), a play by Patrick Marber
 Dealer's Choice (game show), a game show hosted by Jack Clark
 Dealer's Choice (quartet), a barbershop quartet
 "Dealer's Choice" (The Twilight Zone), an episode of the television series The New Twilight Zone